Atlético Zulia Fútbol Club was a Venezuelan professional club and the club has won one First Division title in the professional era. The club was based in Maracaibo.

History
The club was founded in 1996 as Atlético Zulia Fútbol Club, and participated in the 1998 Copa Libertadores.

Honours

National
Venezuelan Primera División: 1
Winners (1): 1997–98
Runner-up (1): 1996–97
Copa Venezuela: 1
Winners (1): 1997

Performance in CONMEBOL competitions
Copa Libertadores: 1 appearance
1998 – Preliminary Round

Defunct football clubs in Venezuela
1996 establishments in Venezuela